Tova Milo is a full Professor of Computer Science at Tel Aviv University and the Dean of the Faculty of Exact Sciences. She served  as the head of the Computer Science Department from 2011 to 2014. 
Milo is the head of the data management group in Tel Aviv University, and her research focuses on Web data management. She received her PhD from the Hebrew University in 1992 under the supervision of Catriel Beeri, and was a postdoctoral fellow at the University of Toronto and INRIA, France, prior to joining Tel Aviv University.

Milo has co-authored over 200 papers in top database conferences and journals, as well as a book on business processes, with over 11,000 citations and H-Index 55 (computed by Google Scholar). 
Milo is one of the most prolific authors in the premier Symposium on Principles of Database Systems and was the first (and only, as of 2015) woman to be a keynote speaker at this symposium. 
In 2010, Milo and her co-authors Victor Vianu and Dan Suciu won the Alberto O. Mendelzon Test-of-Time Award for their paper on type checking for XML transformation languages.

Milo has served on the editorial board of top database journals (VLDB journal and TODS) and as the Program Committee Chair of (among others) the Symposium on Principles of Database Systems, the International Conference on Database Theory (ICDT), as well as the VLDB conference. She is a member of the ICDT Council and the VLDB endowment.

In 2012 Milo was elected as an ACM Fellow for her "contributions to database theory and business process management".
In 2014 she was elected as a member of the Academia Europaea. In 2017 she won the Weizmann Prize for Exact Sciences as well as the VLDB Women in Database Research award. In 2022 she was awarded the IEEE TCDE Impact award.

Milo is featured in the Notable Women in Computing cards.

References

Year of birth missing (living people)
Living people
Israeli computer scientists
Israeli women computer scientists
Fellows of the Association for Computing Machinery
Database researchers
Hebrew University of Jerusalem alumni
Academic staff of Tel Aviv University
Members of Academia Europaea